The 2019–20 Ukrainian Premier League Under-21 and Under-19 season are competitions between the youth teams of the Ukrainian Premier League. The season was abandoned in March due to the COVID-19 pandemic worldwide.

Before the season Dynamo Kyiv was a defending champion in both competition categories (U–21 and U–19 teams). Shakhtar Donetsk was in the lead in competitions among "under-21" teams, while Dynamo Kyiv ended up at top of competition table among "under-19" teams. No titles were officially given out and all youth competitions were declared incomplete.

Teams

Under-21 competition

Standings

Top scorers

Source: Ukrainian Premier League website

Under-19 competition

Top scorers

Source: Ukrainian Premier League website

See also
 2019–20 Ukrainian Premier League

References

Reserves
Ukrainian Premier Reserve League seasons
Ukraine